Fábio Pinheiro Fonseca (born 28 January 1997) is a Portuguese footballer who plays for FC Ordino as a midfielder.

Club career
On 4 January 2017, Fonseca made his professional debut with Varzim in a 2016–17 Taça da Liga match against Arouca.

References

External links

Stats and profile at LPFP 
Fábio Fonseca at ZeroZero

1997 births
Living people
Portuguese footballers
Association football midfielders
Liga Portugal 2 players
Campeonato de Portugal (league) players
Varzim S.C. players
S.C. Braga B players
AD Oliveirense players
FC Ordino players
People from Póvoa de Varzim
Portuguese expatriate footballers
Expatriate footballers in Andorra
Portuguese expatriate sportspeople in Andorra
Sportspeople from Porto District